Thomas Robinson Stadium is a multi-purpose stadium in Nassau, Bahamas.  The largest stadium in the country, it is currently used mostly for soccer matches.  The stadium currently has a capacity of 15,000 people, but has the ability to be expanded to hold 23,000 people. The stadium is also the home of the NCAA Division I College Football (American football) bowl game the Bahamas Bowl.

The stadium is named after Thomas A. "Tom" Robinson, a former track and field star who represented The Bahamas at several Olympic Games.

Bahamas national football team withdrawal from 2014 FIFA World Cup qualifiers 
On 22 August 2011, Bahamas national football team was withdrawn by FIFA, from the 2014 FIFA World Cup qualifiers. Some days later, Bahamas Football Association current president Anton Sealey said the reason was the incomplete construction of the Thomas Robinson Stadium project in Nassau.

Bahamas Bowl (NCAA) 
The Bahamas Bowl is a National Collegiate Athletic Association (NCAA) sanctioned Division I college American football bowl game first played in December 2014 at Thomas Robinson Stadium. The American Athletic Conference gave Conference USA its spot in the Popeyes Bahamas Bowl and C-USA allowed BYU to take its spot in the Miami Beach Bowl for 2014.

C-USA purchased the Bahamas Bowl and will play in the bowl four times between 2014 and 2019 and possibly all six years.

The inaugural game was held on December 24, 2014, and featured the Central Michigan Chippewas (7-5) vs. the Western Kentucky Hilltoppers (7-5).

IAAF World Relays 
In 2014, Thomas Robinson Stadium served as the host of the inaugural IAAF World Relays, a relay athletics meet organized by the IAAF. A new Mondo track was installed for the competition. The Stadium also hosted the 2015 and 2017 IAAF World Relays, and will host the 2024 World Athletics Relays.

References       
 

Football venues in the Bahamas
Bahamas
Multi-purpose stadiums
Athletics (track and field) venues in the Bahamas
Sports venues completed in 1981
American football venues in North America
NCAA bowl game venues
1981 establishments in the Bahamas